Bridge Street Bridge is a swing bridge over the Passaic River connecting Newark and Harrison, New Jersey. Carrying vehicular traffic, the roadway is designated County Route 508.

The span is a rim-bearing Pratt thru truss swing span supported on ashlar substructure with concrete caps originally built by the American Bridge Company. It opened in 1913 and underwent significant rehabilitation in 1981. It is listed on the New Jersey Register of Historic Places  (ID#3093)   The bridge was re-lamped in 2012. The  bridge's electric motor was damaged by Hurricane Sandy in 2012, requiring replacement.

Like the other vehicular swing bridges in Newark, the Jackson Street Bridge and the Clay Street Bridge, it crosses over the tidal navigable portion of the river. and is required to open with 4-hour notice. The swing bridges of Newark are expected to open as much as 10 times a day during a massive clean-up of the Passaic starting in 2019 to allow barges to move contaminated sludge dredged from the river bottom raising concerns about their reliability.
As of 2016 studies were underway to study its replacement.

History
The site of Bridge Street Bridge has been a river crossing since the colonial era. The road between them is known as the Newark Turnpike.

See also
List of crossings of the Lower Passaic River
List of bridges, tunnels, and cuts in Hudson County, New Jersey

References

 U.S. Federal Highway Administration, Washington, D.C. (2010). "Bridge Street over Passaic River, Newark, Essex County, New Jersey." National Bridge Inventory, via Uglybridges.com. Structure No. 0700H03.

External links

Bridges in Newark, New Jersey
Bridges over the Passaic River
Bridges completed in 1913
Road bridges in New Jersey
Harrison, New Jersey
Bridges in Hudson County, New Jersey
1913 establishments in New Jersey
Pratt truss bridges in the United States
Swing bridges in the United States
Steel bridges in the United States